The Battle of Nicaea was fought in 193 between the forces of Septimius Severus and his eastern rival, Pescennius Niger. It took place at Nicaea in Asia Minor. Severus defeated his rival, and ended his bid for the Roman Empire the next year at Issus.

Background

The battle took place in the context of the Year of the Five Emperors, a tumultuous period in the Roman Empire when Emperor Pertinax was assassinated by the Praetorian Guards. The Praetorian Guards then held an auction for the throne, which was won by Didius Julianus, who became emperor. The auction was unpopular, and Septimius Severus, commander of the Pannonian legions, and Pescennius Niger, the governor of Syria (as well as Clodius Albinus, the governor of Britain) all claimed the Roman imperial throne after the auction. 

Severus marched to Rome and had Didius decapitated, then marched to meet Pescennius in battle. Severus had previously defeated Pescennius at the Battle of Cyzicus (193) in Asia Minor.

See also
 List of Roman wars and battles

Nicaea
Nicaea
193
190s in the Roman Empire